Nepetalactol is an iridoid.  It is produced from 8-oxogeranial by the enzyme iridoid synthase.  Nepetalactol is a substrate for the enzyme iridoid oxidase (IO) which produces 7-deoxyloganetic acid. It has been identified in Actinidia polygama (the silver vine) as a major cat attractant, and a mosquito repellent. The fact that mosquitos bite cats with nepetalactol on their fur less often may explain why cats are attracted to silver vine in the first place.

References

Iridoids
Cyclopentanes